Glen Carlton Gray (December 27, 1888 – June 7, 1921) was an American football and basketball player and coach. He served as the head football coach at Oberlin College from 1911 to 1912 and at Washburn University from 1913 to 1915, compiling a career college football coaching record of 23–13–4. Gray was also the head basketball coach at Oberlin in 1910–11 and 1912–13, tallying a mark of 17–7.

Gray coached the Oberlin Yeomen in 1911 and 1912. He went 13–2–1 in those two seasons. Gray was the 13th head football coach for Washburn University in Topeka, Kansas and he held that position for three seasons, from 1913 until 1915. His overall coaching record at Washburn was 11–10–3.

Gray was accidentally shot to death in 1921 when he was mistaken for a bear during an assessment work party. "Clad in a brown khaki shirt and trousers, Glen had gone into the brush to inspect one of his outlying oil lands. An itinerant hunter who was stalking games in the nearby desert country mistook Gray's moving shape for game and shot him. The great Glen Gray fell dead."

Gray was born in Charlotteville, Ontario, Canada, and attended North Tonawanda High School, where he graduated in 1906. He was a quarterback and kicker on the football team where he played for coach Ben Hinkey. "Glen Gray as I remember him was not the agile, hip-swiveling runner many people might imagine," Hinkey recalled. "He had, I believe, a wonderful change of pace and an ability to stop short when travelling at top speed, and then sidestepping a tackler quickly. He was an awfully hard man to tackle, because his speed and stopping ability were so hard to judge."

Gray also starred on the track team, where he was a long jumper. He graduated in 1911. He was inducted in the Oberlin College Sports Hall of Fame in 1986.

Head coaching record

Football

References

External links
 

1888 births
1921 deaths
Accidental deaths in Utah
American football halfbacks
American men's basketball players
Basketball people from Ontario
Canadian players of American football
College men's track and field athletes in the United States
Deaths by firearm in Utah
Firearm accident victims in the United States
Oberlin Yeomen basketball coaches
Oberlin Yeomen basketball players
Oberlin Yeomen football coaches
Oberlin Yeomen football players
Sportspeople from Norfolk County, Ontario
Washburn Ichabods athletic directors
Washburn Ichabods football coaches
Hunting accident deaths